Alexandru Odobescu is a commune in Călărași County, Muntenia, Romania. It is composed of three villages: Alexandru Odobescu, Nicolae Bălcescu (the commune center) and Gălățui.

As of 2007 the population of Alexandru Odobescu is 2,826.

References

Communes in Călărași County
Localities in Muntenia